Matthew Jensen or Matt Jensen may refer to:

Matthew Jensen (cinematographer), an American cinematographer
Matthew Jensen (artist) (born 1980), an American artist
Matt Jensen (rugby union) (born 1992), an American rugby union player
Matt Jensen, a character in the web television series 13 Reasons Why

See also
Matt Jansen